Baridhara Scholars Institution was established on 1 January 2001. It follows the Edexcel curriculum, and is located in Baridhara DOHS. The school is run by the commandant of Dhaka Cantonment board. After the Principal change in 2018, The institution was renamed as Baridhara Scholars' International School & College (BSISC). It is situated at Baridhara DOHS in Dhaka-1206. It has classes from Nursery to Class XII.

References

Schools in Dhaka District
Educational institutions established in 2001
Educational Institutions affiliated with Bangladesh Army
2001 establishments in Bangladesh